Mimathyma ambica, the Indian purple emperor, is a species of nymphalid butterfly found in Asia.

Description

Male

Upperside brownish black; a broad white, inwardly oblique, discal band from vein 3 of the forewing to vein 1 of the hindwing, this band bordered broadly on both sides by brilliant iridescent blue and meeting anteriorly 3 white outwardly oblique spots in interspaces 3, 4, 5 of forewing. Three preapical small spots and an obscure subterminal series of dots on the fore, and a better defined, slightly curved, subterminal series of spots on the hindwing, all white, also on the latter wing an apical and a tornal fulvous-yellow spot. Underside pearly bluish white, the discal band and spots of the upperside showing through pinkish white, the discal spots and band on the forewing bordered interiorly with black, and some black marks in the cell. Forewing: an oblique somewhat sinuous postdiscal, and a more even broad terminal band rich brown, the former ending at the tornus in a fulvous-yellow patch bearing a black spot with some black outer markings, the latter white spotted at the tornal angle. Hindwing with postdiscal straight and terminal broad bands of the same rich brown, a black white-bordered subtornal spot, and another in interspace 2 placed on the brown postdiscal band. Antennae brown; head, thorax and abdomen brown above, white beneath.

Female
Similar to the male with similar markings, but ground colour above dusky brown, the markings yellowish white.

See also
List of butterflies of India
List of butterflies of India (Nymphalidae)

References

ambica
Butterflies of Asia
Fauna of Pakistan
Butterflies described in 1844